The Magain Shalome Synagogue was a synagogue in Karachi, Pakistan. It was built by Solomon David Umerdekar in 1893, when the region was still under British rule as India. The synagogue was destroyed in 1988 by the orders of then President of Pakistan, Muhammad Zia-ul-Haq, following which a shopping plaza was built in its place.

History 
Construction of the synagogue completed in 1893, and was further extended in 1912 by Umerdekar's two sons, Gershon Solomon Umerdekar and Rahamim Solomon Umerdekar. A community hall named “Shegulbai Hall” was built by Abraham Reuben Kamerlekar in memory of Shegulabai Solomon Umerdekar.

In 1916, the Jewish community of Karachi, India, opened a Hebrew school on the synagogue premises, and later constructed the Nathan Abraham Hall in 1918. The synagogue had a main signboard which designated it as the "Bani Israel Masjid”, owing to the region's Muslim-dominated and Urdu-speaking society.

The synagogue soon became the centre of a small but vibrant Jewish community, one of whose leaders, Abraham Reuben, became a councillor on the Karachi city corporation in 1936. The Partition of British India along religious lines between Hindus and Muslims in August 1947 saw the city of Karachi fall within the borders of the new Muslim-majority state of Pakistan, following which the synagogue's front affiliation signboard was changed, designating it under the "Pakistan Bene Israel Community". Less than a year later, the synagogue was attacked and set on fire by Muslim rioters following the 1948 Declaration of Independence of the State of Israel. During this time, several Jews all over Pakistan were attacked, eventually driving parts of the community to flee to neighbouring India. However, the frequency of attacks on Jews in Pakistan increased after each of the Arab−Israeli Wars in 1948, 1956, 1967 and 1973. By the early 1970s, the Pakistani Jewish community had largely left for Israel or India due to the Jewish exodus from Muslim states, effectively rendering the synagogue to be largely dormant. On 17 July 1988, the synagogue was demolished and eventually replaced by a shopping plaza (Madiha Square) in the Ranchore Line neighbourhood of southern Karachi.

Post-demolition extractions 
In 1989, the original ark and podium were reportedly stored by a non-Jew in Karachi, while a Torah scroll case was taken by a Jewish American woman to the United States. In 2004, she donated the synagogue's registers covering the period of 1961–1976 to the Israeli Ben-Zvi Institute in Jerusalem. In these ledgers, a circumcision was recorded in 1963, and several weddings in 1963–64. In 1973, only 15 names were written down, of whom nine were listed as “left Karachi”.

Gallery

See also
 History of the Jews in Pakistan
Antisemitism in Pakistan
Pakistani Jews in Israel
Arab−Israeli conflict

Notes

References

Antisemitism in Pakistan
Synagogues in Pakistan
Religious buildings and structures in Karachi
Orthodox synagogues
Jewish Pakistani history
Former buildings and structures in Pakistan
Sephardi Jewish culture in Asia
Sephardi synagogues
Destroyed synagogues
Attacks on religious buildings and structures in Pakistan
Former synagogues
19th-century synagogues
Muhammad Zia-ul-Haq